Nemapogon caucasicus is a moth of the family Tineidae. It is found in the Caucasus in southern European Russia.

References

Moths described in 1964
Nemapogoninae